Ice Warriors may refer to:

Ice Warriors (game show), a TV game show on ITV
The Ice Warriors, Doctor Who story in which the alien race makes its debut
Ice Warrior, alien race in the BBC television series Doctor Who
Ice Warrior Project, a long-term project founded by arctic explorer Jim McNeill